Mr. Pregnant is an Indian movie in Telugu language. Director of the movie is Srinivas Vinjanampati and it stars Syed Sohel Ryan, Roopa Koduvayur, Suhasini Maniratnam and Raja Ravindra in lead along with Brahmaji and Ali. The film tells the story of Gautham, a furious and smart tattoo artist. A.Appireddy and  Ravireddy Sajja are producing the movie under Mic movies banner.
Mahi is a girl who's madly in love with Gautham since her childhood. Even though he tries to avoid her, Mahi's persistence wins him over everything. The film focuses on Gautham's pregnancy and subsequent issues that come with it.

Plot 
The story is about Gautham who is a raging and clever tattoo artist. He wins every competition he participates in. He always believed in love stories but never fell in love. Mahi is a girl who has loved Gautham since childhood. He constantly tries to ignore her, but Mahi's perseverance wins him over. One fine day they get married. Soon after their marriage, Gautham faces a ridiculous situation which makes him depressed. Mahi gets pregnant after a while and he gets to know about Mahi's pregnancy. Gautham does research on pregnancy and decides to keep the pregnancy. But then, he decides to carry the child himself and deliver the baby. The doctors, although reluctant but supportive, accept his proposal. The aftermath of this decision makes the couple suffer the wrath of the society. They have to deal with the reaction from everyone and their families.

Cast

References

External links 

Indian comedy films
2020s Telugu-language films
Indian pregnancy films
2023 films